The Private College of Business in Prague (VŠO Praha) is a not-for-profit private university in Prague, Czech Republic. It has been a private higher education institution with the accredited study programmes of International Territorial Studies and Economy and Management in Transport and Communications since 2000.

The University College of Business (VŠO) is a member of distinguished European organizations active in the fields of tourism, air transport and education, and is a partner of a number of European universities.

References

External links

Page at Facebook

Universities in the Czech Republic
2000 establishments in the Czech Republic
Educational institutions established in 2000